The Boston mayoral election of 1945 occurred on Tuesday, November 6, 1945. Former Mayor of Boston James Michael Curley defeated acting mayor John E. Kerrigan and four other candidates.

Curley was inaugurated on Monday, January 7, 1946.

Candidates
James Michael Curley, Member of the United States House of Representatives since 1943 and from 1913 to 1914. Mayor of Boston from 1914 to 1918, 1922 to 1926, 1930 to 1934. Governor of Massachusetts from 1935 to 1937. Member of the Massachusetts House of Representatives from 1902–1903.
Michael Paul Feeney, member of the Massachusetts House of Representatives since 1939 and the Boston City Council since 1944.
John E. Kerrigan, acting Mayor of Boston since Maurice J. Tobin's resignation in January 1945. Member of the Boston City Council since 1933.
Joseph Lee, member of the Boston School Committee from 1937 to 1941.
William Arthur Reilly, former Boston Fire Commissioner and a former member of the Boston Finance Commission and Boston School Committee.
John J. Sawtelle, Member of the Massachusetts Governor's Council since 1943.

Results

See also
List of mayors of Boston, Massachusetts

References

Further reading
 

Boston mayoral
Boston
1945
Non-partisan elections
1940s in Boston